Chishmy (Şişmä) is an urban locality (a work settlement) and the administrative center of Chishminsky District in the Republic of Bashkortostan, Russia, located near the Dyoma River. As of the 2010 Census, its population was 21,196.

Administrative and municipal status
Within the framework of administrative divisions, Chishmy serves as the administrative center of Chishminsky District. As an administrative division, it is incorporated within Chishminsky District as Chishminsky Settlement Council. As a municipal division, Chishminsky Settlement Council is incorporated within Chishminsky Municipal District as Chishminsky Urban Settlement.

References

Notes

Sources

Urban-type settlements in Bashkortostan
